Henry Alexis Tardent (1 March 1853 – 5 September 1929) was a Swiss-Australian writer and agricultural scientist in Queensland. He was politically left-wing and wrote for the labour-aligned Daily Standard for many years.

Early life
Tardent was born on 1 March 1853 in Le Sépey, Vaud, Switzerland. He was the son of French speakers Marie Louise (née Perrod) and Louis Marc Samuel Tardent. After being educated in local schools, Tardent travelled through Eastern Europe and eventually matriculated from Odessa University. He spent time in Galicia, the Ukraine and Bessarabia and learned Polish, German, Russian and Latin. He worked as a language teacher and in 1876 married Hortense Tardent, a distant relative, at the Swiss wine-growing colony in Chabag (present-day Ukraine).

Move to Australia
Due to political instability and poor health, Tardent and his family immigrated to Australia in 1887. He established a farm and winery at Roma, Queensland, which he ran as a co-operative. He became a naturalised British subject in 1890. Following an economic downturn, in 1897 Tardent took up an appointment as manager of the Westbrook State Farm, an experimental farm near Toowoomba. He was transferred to the Biggenden State Farm in 1898, but resigned in 1901 when the state government objected to his political activities.

Political activities and journalism career
Tardent was an early member of the Australian Labor Party (ALP). He stood for the party at the 1902 state election in the seat of Burnett. From 1904 to 1908 he was the publisher of the Toowoomba Democrat and Downs Agriculturist, while he ran an insurance business in Toowoomba. He moved to Atherton and became managing editor of the Tableland Examiner from 1909 to 1910. He was most prominent as the agricultural editor of the ALP-affiliated Daily Standard from 1913 until his death in 1929.

Other activities
Tardent published a number of books across varying subjects, including biographies of George Essex Evans, Richard John Randall, and Ellis Rowan. He was a founding member of the Brisbane branch  of the Alliance française. In March 1929, the French government awarded him the rank of Officier d'Académie in the Ordre des Palmes académiques.

Tardent was a major influence on his grandson P. R. Stephensen, who achieved some literary fame but was better known for his involvement with left-wing and right-wing extremist groups.

References

1929 deaths
Swiss emigrants to Australia
Swiss expatriates in Ukraine
Odesa University alumni
Australian agriculturalists
Australian biographers
Australian newspaper publishers (people)
Agricultural writers
Officiers of the Ordre des Palmes Académiques
Australian newspaper editors
Naturalised citizens of Australia
People from Aigle District
1853 births